Trachyboa gularis, commonly known as the Ecuadorian eyelash boa, is a species of nonvenomous snake in the family Tropidophiidae. It is endemic to Ecuador, and is only known from an area where suitable habitat has been almost completely destroyed. Recent confirmed records are also lacking, and the IUCN has concluded that Trachyboa gularis is a possibly extinct species.

References

Further reading
Boulenger GA. 1893. Catalogue of the Snakes in the British Museum (Natural History). Volume I., Containing the Families ... Boidæ ... London: Trustees of the British Museum (Natural History). (Taylor and Francis, printers). xiii + 448 pp. + Plates I-XXVIII. (Trachyboa gularis, pp. 109–110).
Freiberg M. 1982. Snakes of South America. Hong Kong: T.F.H. Publications. 189 pp. . (Trachyboa gularis, p. 88).
Jan G. 1861. Iconographie générale des Ophidiens. Deuxième livraison. Paris: Baillière. Index + Plates I-VI. (Trachyboa gularis, Plate II, Figure 3).
Peters W. 1860. "Eine neue Gattung von Riesenschlangen vor, welche von einem gebornen Preussen, Hrn. Carl Reiss, in Guayaquil nebst mehreren andern werthvollen Naturalien dem zoologischen Museum zugesandt worden ist ". Monatsberichte der Königlichen Preussischen Akademie der Wissenschaften zu Berlin 1860: 200–202. (Trachyboa gularis, new species). (in German).

Tropidophiidae
Snakes of South America
Reptiles of Ecuador
Endemic fauna of Ecuador
Reptiles described in 1860
Taxa named by Wilhelm Peters